The Punjas Rugby Series was a rugby union challenge series played between Fiji A and Tonga A. It was sponsored by Fijian company Punja & Sons and played in Fiji in 2010 and 2011. There was some discussion about expanding the series to include teams from Samoa, the Cook Islands and PNG, but this did not eventuate and the series ended after the 2011 edition.

Punjas Rugby Series 2010

 Fiji A won the series on aggregate score. Fiji A's 34 points to Tonga A's 30

Punjas Rugby Series 2011

 Fiji A won the series by 3 points on aggregate score.

References 

International rugby union competitions hosted by Fiji
International rugby union competitions hosted by Tonga
Punjas Series
Punjas Series
Punjas Series
Punjas Series
Rugby union competitions in Oceania for national teams
Defunct rugby union competitions for national teams